Scalptia crispa is a species of sea snail, a marine gastropod mollusk in the family Cancellariidae, the nutmeg snails.

Description

Distribution

References

Cancellariidae
Gastropods described in 1832